The Moose Cree First Nation (formerly known as Moose Factory Band of Indians) is a Cree First Nation band government in northern Ontario, Canada. Their traditional territory is on the west side of James Bay. The nation has two reserves: Factory Island 1 (the northern two-thirds of Moose Factory Island); and Moose Factory 68, a tract of land about 15 km upstream on the Moose River covering .

Name
The name "Moose Factory" comes from its location on the Moose River, as well as from the fur trade era. The officer in charge of the trading post was referred to as the "factor." Another account is that the name originates from the name of the river and a furniture factory that was once located within the community.

History
The Cree are an indigenous people of the Subarctic, who historically hunted and gathered in seasonal migrations. In summer, they traveled on waterways by canoe: fishing and harvesting berries and other food staples. In fall, they hunted waterfowl along the shores of James Bay. Prior to winter, Cree families traveled to their winter settlements, where they hunted and trapped big game and small, fur-bearing animals. Prior to spring thaw, the families hunted waterfowl as they migrated north. This was an historical, annual cycle for the Swampy Cree.

Early exposure to European society heavily influenced Cree lifestyles. The Hudson's Bay Company establishing a trading post for fur in 1673 in the Moose Factory region. As a result, Cree congregated in and around the fur trade post and became exposed to European customs. Moose Factory became Ontario's first English-speaking settlement.

In 1905, on behalf of the British Crown, treaty commissioners negotiated a treaty with Moose Cree First Nation. Treaty No. 9 was signed on 9 August 1905. The treaty defined two tracts of land to beset aside for use and "benefit" of Moose Cree First Nation. The first tract, Moose Factory Indian Reserve No. 1 occupies approximately two-thirds of Moose Factory Island. The second tract, Moose Factory Indian reserve No. 68 is located approximately 10 miles south of Moose Factory at the mouth of the French River.

Population
The population of Moose Cree First Nation was 4,440 in September 2014.

People
Prominent Canadian artist Duane Linklater is Omaskeko Cree, of Moose Cree First Nations. He is represented by Catriona Jeffries Gallery, Vancouver, British Columbia, and his work has been shown locally, nationally, and internationally.

References

External links
The Moose Cree First Nation Website
Indian and Northern Affairs Canada: First Nation Detail
Moose Cree Education Authority
Mushkegowuk Council

First Nations governments in Ontario
Nishnawbe Aski Nation
Cree governments